Bijbehara (known as Vejibror in Kashmiri, is a town and a notified area committee in Anantnag district of the Indian administered union territory of Jammu and Kashmir. It is located on NH 44, and jehlum bank. Bijbehara town is also known as "Town of Chinars" because of a number of Chinars there especially two Chinar gardens (Paadshaahi Bagh and Dara Shikoh Garden). Bijbehara is the home to oldest chinar tree in the region.

Etymology
The word Bijbehara or Vijbor or Vijbror has been derived from Sanskrit word Vijayeshwar.  It was an ancient site of Shiva Vijayeshwar.

Geography

It has an average elevation of 1,591 metres (5,223 feet). It is situated to the north of district headquarters on the banks of Jhelum River popularly known locally as "Veth". Bijbehara lies four miles north of Anantnag town.

The town is surrounded and intersected by plateaus, including the Totak Shah, from where the whole town can be seen. There are many other plateaus which are being urbanized.

The town localities of Bijbehara include: Goriwan chowk, Old town, Ziyarat road, Baba Mohalla, Zirpara chowk, Sadar Bazar, Vaid Mohalla, Dobighat, Khar Mohalla, Eidgah, Pandit Hamaam, Pomposh Mohalla, Saraf Mohalla, Peershah Mohalla, Ahanger Mohalla, Feroze Shah Mohalla, Sheikh Mohalla and GH pora.

The town has recently expanded to include new housing colonies such as: New Colony Bijbehara, Eidgah basti, Qazi Mohalla, Sicop Colony, Padshahi Bagh Colony, Friends Colony, Deewan Bagh, Eidgah Colony and Tehsil Road-Baghandar.

Divisions

The areas which come under the constituency of Bijbehara are as follows:
Mattan
Nanil
Kanelwan
Push Kriri
Khiram
Akura

Demographics

The town had a population of 22,789 (12,057 men and 10,732 women) per the report released by Census India 2011. Children aged 0–6 made up 14.97% (3,411) of the total population of Bijbehara.

Education

Religious places
Baba Naseeb-ud-Din Ghazi shrine, Bijbehara
Totak shah Sahib shrine, Hill Station New colony Bijbehara
Vijayeshwar Mahadev Temple, Bijbehara

List of villages in Bijbehara Tehsil

There are about 52 villages in Bijbehara:

Transportation

Road
Bijbehara is connected to other places in Jammu and Kashmir and India by the NH 44 which passes through Bijbehara and other intra-district roads.

Rail
Bijbehara railway station in the town is part of the 119 km long Kashmir Railway that runs from Baramulla to Banihal.

Air
The nearest airport is Srinagar International Airport located 51 kilometres from Bijbehara.

Notable people
 Mufti Mohammad Sayeed, politician from erstwhile State of Jammu and Kashmir and founder of Jammu & Kashmir Peoples Democratic Party(PDP). He served as Chief Minister of Jammu and Kashmir and Home Minister of India.
 Mehbooba Mufti, president of PDP, served as the Chief Minister of erstwhile Jammu and Kashmir State. She is the daughter of Mufti Mohammad Sayeed.
 Parvez Rasool, Indian cricketer.
 Javed Ahmed Tak, social work.

See also

Jammu and Kashmir
Anantnag
Kokernag
Parvez Rasool
Kishtwar

References

External links

Cities and towns in Anantnag district
Ancient Indian cities